Vice admiral Ahmed Saeed  is a three-star rank admiral in the Pakistan Navy currently serving as the senior commander of the Naval Strategic Forces Command since 2018.

Awards and decorations

References

External links
Navy promotion

Pakistan Naval Academy alumni
National Defence University, Pakistan alumni
Pakistani expatriates in China
Pakistan Navy admirals
Year of birth missing (living people)
Living people